"Respectable" is a song by English musical duo Mel and Kim from their only studio album, F.L.M. (1987). It was released on 18 February 1987 as the album's second single. The song reached number one on the UK Singles Chart for one week in March 1987, becoming the second UK number-one single produced by Stock Aitken Waterman (SAW), following Dead or Alive's "You Spin Me Round (Like a Record)" (1985), and the first UK number one that the trio had written themselves. The single also topped the charts in Australia, Belgium, Finland, the Netherlands, New Zealand, Switzerland and West Germany.

Background 
The track was conceived as a more commercial follow up to the act's debut hit, "Showing Out (Get Fresh at the Weekend)". Supreme Records head Nick East requested that SAW produce a song in line with the flavour of their debut hit, but more accessible. The lyrics of the song were inspired by the sisters' dismissive and shame-free response to a tabloid scandal over the emergence of old nude glamour photos of Mel. East expressed strong reservations over the track's trademark stuttering hook, fearing it was too gimmicky, overly commercial and an unnecessary departure from the sound of their debut. Pete Waterman and Mike Stock strongly objected to the hook's potential removal. East changed his mind after an early performance of the track on a TV show in the Netherlands received a rapturous response. The sampled laughter heard through the song was captured during studio conversation between the act and producers, with the sisters initially unaware the interaction would end up on the record.

Impact and legacy 
British magazine Classic Pop ranked the song number 6 in their list of Top 40 Stock Aitken Waterman songs in 2021. They wrote, "According to Kim the sisters didn’t really align themselves with the Hit Factory, arriving before the SAW machine took form, but they were integral to the rise of the threesome. SAW’s first actual written composition to reach No.1, it reflected Mel & Kim’s down-to-earth, playful charisma, at the same time mirroring the PWL ad slogan (“You can love or hate us, you ain’t ever gonna change us… we ain’t ever going to be respectable”). An incredible response to Stock’s infamous tay-tay-tay line when performed live meant Respectable became one of the top-selling UK singles of 1987."

Cover versions and sampling
Girl band Girls@Play released a cover version of "Respectable" in 2001, which peaked at number 29 in the United Kingdom.
Australian actor and singer Tim Campbell covered the song on his 2018 album Electrifying 80s.

The song was sampled in Pop Will Eat Itself's song "Hit the Hi-Tech Groove" from the 1987 album Box Frenzy. The Pop Will Eat Itself song, which skewers Stock/Aiken/Waterman-style manufactured pop, has in its chorus the line "you don't need respectability."

The song also features in BBC comedy series Gary: Tank Commander, as the mobile phone ringtone of the titular character.

Track listings

7-inch single
A. "Respectable" – 3:22
B. "Respectable" (instrumental) – 4:04

Japanese 7-inch single
A. "Respectable" – 3:22
B. "Respectable" (dub version) – 4:09

12-inch single
A. "Respectable" (club mix) – 6:15
AA1. "Respectable" (7″ version) – 3:22
AA2. "Respectable" (Extra Beats version) – 8:08

UK 12-inch single (remix)
UK limited-edition 12-inch picture disc
German 12-inch maxi single (special remix)
A. "Respectable" (The Tabloid mix) – 7:50
AA1. "Respectable" (7″ version) – 3:22
AA2. "Respectable" (Extra Beats version) – 8:08

UK 12-inch single (remix)
A. "Respectable" (Shop mix)
AA1. "Respectable" (7″ version) – 3:22
AA2. "Respectable" (Extra Beats version) – 8:08

US and Canadian 12-inch single
A. "Respectable" (vocal/club mix) – 6:15
B. "Respectable" (The Tabloid mix) – 7:50

Charts

Weekly charts

Year-end charts

Certifications

References

1987 singles
1987 songs
Atlantic Records singles
Dutch Top 40 number-one singles
European Hot 100 Singles number-one singles
Mel and Kim songs
Number-one singles in Australia
Number-one singles in Finland
Number-one singles in Germany
Number-one singles in New Zealand
Number-one singles in Switzerland
Song recordings produced by Stock Aitken Waterman
Songs written by Matt Aitken
Songs written by Mike Stock (musician)
Songs written by Pete Waterman
Supreme Records singles
UK Singles Chart number-one singles
Ultratop 50 Singles (Flanders) number-one singles